Corentin Louis Kervran (3 March 1901 – 2 February 1983) was a French scientist. Kervran was born in Quimper, Finistère (Brittany), and received a degree as an engineer in 1925. In World War II he was part of the French Resistance.

Kervran proposed that nuclear transmutation occurs in living organisms, which he called "biological transmutation". He made this claim after doing an experiment with chickens which he believed showed that they were generating calcium in their egg shells while there was no calcium in their food or soil.  He had no known scientific explanation for it.  Such transmutations are not possible according to known physics, chemistry, and biology. Proponents of biological transmutations fall outside mainstream physics and are not part of accepted scientific discourse.

Biological transmutation

In the 1960s, Louis Kervran claimed to have conducted experiments and studies demonstrating violations of the law of conservation of mass by biological systems, according to which the amount of each chemical element is preserved in all chemical reactions. He claimed that organisms can transmute potassium into calcium by nuclear fusion in the course of making an egg shell:

 +  → 

Since biological systems do not contain mechanisms to produce the speed, temperature, and pressure necessary for such reactions, even for extremely short periods of time, this contradicts basic physical laws.

Kervran said that his work was supported by prior studies and by reports of industrial accidents involving carbon monoxide. Kervran said that enzymes can facilitate biological transmutations using the weak nuclear force, by what he called "neutral currents." His response to criticism was to claim that physical laws do not apply to biological reactions, which contradicts the mainstream understanding that physical laws apply for all scales and conditions.

The alleged transmutations are claimed to resemble cold fusion. There is currently no accepted theoretical model which would predict cold fusion to occur. 

In 1993, Kervran was awarded a parodic Ig Nobel prize in Physics due to his "improbable research" in biological transmutation. The award description called him an "ardent admirer of alchemy."

Books

In French:
Transmutations Biologiques: Métabolismes Aberrants de l'Azote, le Potassium et le Magnésium (1962) Paris : Librairie Maloine S.A. (2nd ed. 1963, 3rd ed. 1965)
Transmutations naturelles non radioactives ; une propriete nouvelle de la matiere Paris : Librairie Maloine, (1963) 
Transmutations à la faible énergie : synthèse et développements (1964) Paris : Maloine 
A la découverte des transmutations biologiques : une explication des phénomènes biologiques aberrants (1966) Paris : Le Courrier du livre 
Preuves Relatives à l'Existence des Transmutations Biologiques (1968) Paris : Librairie Maloine S.A.
Transmutations biologiques en agronomie (1970) Paris : Librairie Maloine S.A.
Preuves en géologie et physique de transmutations à faible énergie (1973) Paris : Maloine  
Transmutations Biologique et Physique Moderne (1982) Paris : Librairie Maloine S.A.

English translations:
Biological Transmutations C. Louis Kervran,  translation and adaptation by Michel Abehsera, 1989, 1998 (first published in 1972)   (extract of three of Kervran's books)
Biological transmutations, revised and edited by Herbert & Elizabeth Rosenauer, London, Crosby Lockwood 1972 (reprinted by Beekman, New York, in 1998 under )
Biological Transmutation. Natural Alchemy. Louis Kervran and George Ohsawa, George Ohsawa Macrobiotic Foundation, Oroville, California, USA 1971 (reprinted 1975, 1976) 48 pages.

See also
 Cold fusion

References

Further reading

 Corentin Louis Kervran: "Hors-d'œuvre", an autobiographical note in Preuves en Biologie de Transmutations a Faible Energie  Paris: Maloine S.A., 1975

1901 births
1983 deaths
Pseudoscientific physicists
People from Quimper
Writers from Brittany
French male writers
20th-century French male writers